Model Town may refer to:

 Model Town, Kolkata
 Model Town, Lahore is a suburb of Lahore, Punjab, Pakistan
 Model Town (Delhi) is a subdivision of North Delhi, India
 Model Town Assembly constituency
 Model Town metro station
 Model Town Humak, a suburb of Islamabad, Pakistan

See also
 Model village